During the 1929–30 English football season, Brentford competed in the Football League Third Division South. Brentford finished as runners-up, the club's highest finish in the pyramid at that time and statistically it is the club's best-ever season. Brentford became the fifth club to win all their home Football League matches in a season and as of the end of the 2015–16 season, the Bees' total of 21 home victories from 21 matches has never been bettered. Billy Lane set a new club record of 33 goals in all competitions, which would stand for three years and the club also reached the final of the London Challenge Cup for the first time.

Season summary

Brentford manager Harry Curtis tinkered with his squad in the 1929 off-season, releasing half backs Jack Beacham, Stephen Dearn and a number of young forwards who failed to make the grade during the previous season. In came full back Tom Adamson, half backs Reginald Davies (the new captain), Harry Salt and forwards Cecil Blakemore, Jackie Foster, Billy Lane and John Payne. Brentford went on to have their best season at that time in the Football League, ending 1929 in second place and ascending to the top of the Third Division South on 25 January 1930. The good results were due to a consistently fit starting XI, which went unchanged for 21 consecutive matches in all competitions between 2 November 1929 and 15 March 1930, a club record. Top spot was held onto until a 0–0 draw with Exeter City on 29 March saw Plymouth Argyle overtake the Bees and automatic promotion was effectively conceded after successive defeats in mid-April. Brentford finished as runners-up and would remain in the Third Division South for 1930–31. The Bees finished the season with four players scoring 15 goals or more – Billy Lane (33), Jack Lane (19), John Payne (16) and Cecil Blakemore (15).

Brentford became the fifth club to win all their home league matches in a season and as of the end of the 2015–16 season, the club's achievement of 21 wins from 21 matches is still a national record. Billy Lane's 33 goals smashed Brentford's record for goals scored in a season, which stood until surpassed by Jack Holliday in 1933. A club record was also set for most league victories in a season (28, which would not be equalled until the Bees' promotion from League One in 2013–14), most home league goals scored in a season (66) and owing to the 100% winning home record, fewest home league draws and defeats (0). The 6–0 victory over Merthyr Town on 14 September 1929 set a new club record for highest winning margin in a Football League match, while the 5–1 victory over West London rivals Fulham on 22 February 1930 attracted a 21,966 crowd to Griffin Park, then a club record for a home match. Brentford also reached the final of the London Challenge Cup for the first time, but lost 2–1 to West Ham United. In 2013, 1929–30 was voted by the Brentford supporters as the club's fourth-best season.

In recognition of the club's unbeaten home record, at the club's annual meeting in July 1930, chairman Louis P. Simon presented a silver shield, on which were inscribed the names of the principle XI which achieved the feat – Fox, Stevenson, Adamson, Davies, Bain, Salt, Foster, J. Lane, W. Lane, Blackmore and Payne.

League table

Results
Brentford's goal tally listed first.

Legend

Football League Third Division South

FA Cup

 Sources: Statto, 11v11, 100 Years of Brentford

Playing squad 
Players' ages are as of the opening day of the 1929–30 season.

 Sources: 100 Years of Brentford, Timeless Bees, Football League Players' Records 1888 to 1939

Coaching staff

Statistics

Appearances and goals

Players listed in italics left the club mid-season.
Source: 100 Years of Brentford

Goalscorers 

Players listed in italics left the club mid-season.
Source: 100 Years of Brentford

Management

Summary

Transfers & loans 
Cricketers are not included in this list.

References 

Brentford F.C. seasons
Brentford